Bihar Assembly elections were held twice in the year 2005. There was a fractured verdict in the February 2005 Assembly Election. Since no government could be formed in Bihar, fresh elections were held in October–November the same year.

The Janata Dal (United) emerged as the majority seat winner after the Oct- Nov 2005 election, and ruled along with the Bharatiya Janata Party (2nd Highest) as part of the National Democratic Alliance. The incumbent chief minister was Nitish Kumar.

One of the oldest political parties in India, The Indian national Congress surprisingly finished 4th and 5th in both the elections respectively.

Schedule
Bihar Assembly elections were held in four phases in October 2005. A total of 2135 candidates were contested from the 243 constituencies in the Bihar Assembly elections of October 2005. Out of 2135 candidates in the October 2005 elections, male and female candidates were 1999 (93%) and 136 (7%) respectively.

Summary of results

Detailed result

Bihar Assembly elections were held in four phases in October 2005. A total of 2135 candidates were contested from the 243 constituencies in the Bihar Assembly elections of October 2005. Out of 2135 candidates in the October 2005 elections, male and female candidates were 1999 (93%) and 136 (7%) respectively.

The Janata Dal (United) was the largest party in the seat after the Oct- Nov 2005 election, and ruled along with the Bharatiya Janata Party as part of the National Democratic Alliance. The incumbent chief minister was Nitish Kumar.

See also
 Politics of Bihar

Notes

References

State Assembly elections in Bihar
2000s in Bihar
Bihar